Sir John Arthur Herbert GCIE (16 December 1895 – 11 December 1943) was a Conservative Party politician in the United Kingdom and a colonial governor in British India, serving as Governor of Bengal from 1939 till his death in December 1943.

Early life
Herbert was born at Coldbrook, Monmouthshire, Wales on 16 December 1895. He was the only son of Sir Arthur James Jones-Herbert GCVO, of Llanarth, Monmouthshire, and Dame Helen Louise Gammell, of Rhode Island. From his father's first marriage to Mariquita Consuello Haffenden (the widow of Count Henri Nicolaieff), he had an elder half-sister, Jeanne Marie Therese Herbert, who married Francis Lane-Fox (elder brother of George Lane-Fox, 1st Baron Bingley) and, after his death, Alfred Edmund Brödermann. His niece, Maria Dolores Brödermann, married Sir Charles Mander, 3rd Baronet.

Career
Herbert was commissioned a Second Lieutenant in the British Army in 1919. He was elected as Member of Parliament (MP) for Monmouth in Wales at a by-election in 1934. In that year, he was made an honorary Major. He represented the constituency in the House of Commons until his resignation on 1 July 1939, when he was appointed as Governor of Bengal. Herbert was made an honorary Colonel in 1939 and was also knighted with the GCIE upon becoming Governor of Bengal.  He served as Governor until his death in 1943, aged 48.

Personal life
On 11 June 1924, Herbert married Lady Mary Fox-Strangeways (1903–1948) in Newport, Rhode Island. Lady Mary was the eldest daughter of Giles Fox-Strangways, 6th Earl of Ilchester and Lady Helen Vane-Tempest-Stewart (a daughter of the 6th Marquess of Londonderry). Together, they were the parents of:

 Robin Arthur Elidyr Herbert (b. 1934), who studied at Eton, Oxford and Harvard and who married Margaret Griswold Lewis, a daughter of Geoffrey Whitney Lewis (who was with the U.S. Mission to NATO in Paris), in 1960.

Sir John died at Government House, Calcutta on 11 December 1943. Following his death, his widow served as a Woman of the Bedchamber to Princess Elizabeth from 1944 until her death in 1948.

References

External links 
 

 Photograph of Sir John Herbert as New Bengal Governor (Photo by Keystone/Hulton Archive/Getty Images)

1895 births
1943 deaths
Conservative Party (UK) MPs for Welsh constituencies
UK MPs 1931–1935
UK MPs 1935–1945
British governors of Bengal
Knights Grand Commander of the Order of the Indian Empire